Sarhalat (also Romanized as Sarḩalat and Sarḩallat) is a village in Koregah-e Gharbi Rural District, in the Central District of Khorramabad County, Lorestan Province, Iran. At the 2006 census, its population was 144, in 26 families.

References 

Towns and villages in Khorramabad County